Step Up Your Game is the first full-length studio album by the Norwegian band Gerilja. It was streamed online beginning 20 May 2013 and released on CD and vinyl on 27 May 2013 in Norway by Razzia Notes and two days later in Sweden.

Track listing

References 

2013 debut albums
Gerilja albums